Willowild is a suburb of Johannesburg, South Africa. It is located in Region B of the City of Johannesburg Metropolitan Municipality.  Willowild was originally a farm and dates from at least the early 20th century. The farm was subdivided and plots sold off for residential development in 1970, leaving the original farmhouse on one of the plots.

References

Johannesburg Region B